Currently, the Russian Federation holds an unknown number of soldiers in Transnistria, an unrecognized breakaway state internationally recognized as part of Moldova. This Russian military presence dates back to 1992, when the 14th Guards Army intervened in the Transnistria War in support of the Transnistrian separatist forces. Following the end of the war, which ended in a Russian-backed Transnistrian victory and in the de facto independence of the region, the Russian forces stayed in a purportedly peacekeeping mission and reorganized in 1995 into the Operational Group of Russian Forces (OGRF), currently guarding the Cobasna ammunition depot. Some other Russian soldiers also participate in the Joint Control Commission between Moldova, Russia and Transnistria since 1992. 

The Government of Moldova currently views the presence of Russian troops in Moldova as illegitimate and has called for their withdrawal and replacement by international forces. Russia however has opposed this. On 15 March 2022, the Parliamentary Assembly of the Council of Europe recognized Transnistria as a Moldovan territory occupied by Russia.

Background

14th Guards Army

The 14th Army was formed as a unit of the Soviet Army on 25 November 1956 from the 10th Guards Budapest Rifle Corps, formerly part of the Odessa Military District with headquarters in Chișinău. In 1964 the 88th Motor Rifle Division became the 180th Motor Rifle Division, and the 118th MRD became the 48th MRD. In the 1980s the army headquarters was moved to Tiraspol, within the then Moldavian SSR. By 1991, the army was made up of four motor rifle divisions and other smaller units. Only the 59th Guards Motor Rifle Division and some smaller units, including the 1162nd Anti-Aircraft Rocket Regiment were on the left bank of the Dniester in the region of Transnistria. Other formations, including the 28th Guards and 180th Motor Rifle Divisions, were over the border in Ukraine and became part of the Ukrainian Ground Forces. According to the Army sources, local Transnistrians made up the great majority of its soldiers, including 51 percent of the officers and 79 percent of the draftees.

In 1990, the 14th Guards Army included the following units.

 173rd Missile Brigade (Bender)
 189th Guards Missile Brigade (Bălți): 13 R-145BM
 156th Anti-Aircraft Missile Brigade (Ungheni)
 865th Air Defense Command Post
 4th Artillery Regiment (Ungheni): 36 D-30 howitzer, 24 2A36 "Giatsint", 26 BM-27 Uragan, 3 PRP-3, 3 Klyon 1, 2 1V19, 5 R-145BM, 54 MT-LB (for 47 T-12)
 803rd Rocket Artillery Regiment (disbanded, assets to 4th Artillery Reg)
 2335th Reconnaissance Artillery Regiment (disbanded, assets to 4th Artillery Reg)
 714th Separate Reconnaissance Artillery Battalion (Ungheni)
 36th Separate Helicopter Squadron (Tirospol): 8 Mi-8, 1 Mi-6, 2 Mi-24K, 2 Mi-24R
 321st Separate Squadron of Unmanned Reconnaissance Systems (Tiraspol)
 905th Air Assault Battalion (Tiraspol)
 194th Pontoon Bridge Regiment, 115th Separate Engineer Sapper Battalion (Parcani): 4 IRM
 15th Separate Signal Regiment (Tiraspol): 9 R-145BM, 1 R-156BTR, 1 R-137B, 1 P-240BT
 108th Separate Radio Engineering Regiment (Bender)
 130th Chemical Defense Battalion, 785th NBC Reconnaissance Battalion (Bender)
 58th Radio Engineering Battalion, 976th and 2242nd Electronic Warfare Battalions (Bender)
 5381st Equipment Storage Base (Florești): 63 MT-LB, 25 R-145BM, 2 RKhM Kashalot, 3 UR-67 as well as 27 9M113 Konkurs, 32 S-60 (former 86th Guards Motor Rifle Division)

Conflict in Transnistria

Tensions between the region of what today composes Transnistria and the central government of Moldova arose during the latest stages of the Soviet Union (USSR), during its dissolution. This conflict eventually erupted the Transnistria War, the most active stage of this conflict.

Transnistria War

While the official policy of the Russian Federation early after the outbreak of the widespread armed conflict in 1992 was one of neutrality, many soldiers and officers of the 14th Army were sympathetic to the PMR cause and had defected to the PMR and actively participated in the fighting as part of its armed forces, the Republican Guards. Furthermore, a considerable amount of the army's materiel was taken without resistance or given to the PMR armed forces.

The commanding officer of the Army, General G. I. Yakovlev, was openly supportive of the newly created PMR. He participated in the founding of the PMR, served in the PMR Supreme Soviet and accepted the position as the first chairman of the PMR Department of Defense on 3 December 1991, causing the Commander-in-Chief of the CIS armed forces, Yevgeny Shaposhnikov, to relieve him of his rank and service in the Russian military. Yakovlev's successor, General Yuriy Netkachev has assumed a more neutral stance in the conflict. However, his attempts at mediation between Chișinău (capital of Moldova) and Tiraspol (capital of PMR) were largely unsuccessful.

On 23 March 1992, Shaposhnikov signed a decree authorising the transfer of military equipment of 14th Guards Army units stationed on the right bank of the Dniester to the Republic of Moldova. This military equipment had constituted the majority of the materiel utilized by the Moldovan National Army in the ensuing War of Transnistria. A second decree, issued on 1 April by Boris Yeltsin, transferred the personnel of the 14th Guards Army, as well as all left-bank military equipment, including a large ammunition depot at Cobasna, under Russian control.

By June 1992 the situation had escalated to an open military engagement. With the near disintegration of the Russian army during the heaviest fighting in and around the city of Bender (Tighina), in the wake of a coordinated offensive by Moldovan forces, General Major Alexander Lebed arrived at the 14th Army headquarters on 23 June with standing orders to stop the ongoing conflict with any available means, inspect the army, prevent the theft of armaments from its depots and ensure the unimpeded evacuation of armaments and Army personnel from Moldovan and through Ukrainian territory. After briefly assessing the situation, he assumed command of the army, relieving Netkachev, and ordered his troops to enter the conflict directly. On 3 July at 03:00, a massive artillery strike originating from the 14th Army formations stationed on left bank of the Dniester obliterated the Moldovan force concentrated in Hîrbovăț forest, near Bender, effectively ending the military phase of the conflict. According to at least one Moldovan source, 112 Moldovan soldiers were killed by the bombardment.

Aftermath

End of the war and the Operational Group of Russian Forces

After the end of the conflict, a separate Russian unit was moved into the region as part of the joint Moldovan–Russian–Transnistrian peacekeeping force, the Joint Control Commission. The 14th Guards Army itself was reformed in April 1995 into the Operational Group of Russian Forces (OGRF) which came under the command of the Moscow Military District and was charged with guarding the Cobasna ammunition depot. Another more recent source gives the disbandment date of the 14th Guards Army as 25 June 1995. The 59th Guards Motor Rifle Division became the 8th Guards Motor Rifle Brigade on 1 June 1997. The force is now around 1,200 strong, and according to Kommersant-Vlast in 2005, consisted of the 8th Guards Motor Rifle Brigade, the 1162nd Anti-Aircraft Rocket Regiment, 15th Signals Regiment, and other support units. 

On 1 November 2002, the 8th MR Brigade was disbanded, and the remaining personnel, numbering 5,719 effectives were absorbed into the Peacekeeping Forces command.

As a result of reduction in the strength of the Operational Group (commander General-Major Boris Sergeyev) the remaining strength as of 2006 is about 1,000–1,500 troops, and comprises:
82nd and 113th Separate Peacekeeping Motor-Rifle battalions
Independent security and support battalion
A helicopter detachment
Several small administrative detachments

The operational group was  commanded by Colonel Dmitry Zelenkov of Russia and numbered 1,500 troops. It serves alongside the Joint Control Commission.

Current situation and proposed withdrawal
Russia agreed to withdraw its 14th Army from Moldovan territory in an agreement signed 21 October 1994 and acknowledged in the December Budapest declaration of the Conference on Security and Co-operation in Europe. The OSCE expressed concern over the lack of progress in its 1996 Lisbon Document. At the OSCE Istanbul summit in November 1999, Russia again promised to withdraw its forces from Moldova (and from Georgia), this time with a firm commitment to a deadline of 31 December 2002 written into the summit documents. These promises were not fulfilled.

On 18 November 2008, the NATO Parliamentary Assembly adopted a resolution, urging Russia to "respect its commitments which were taken at the Istanbul OSCE Summit in 1999 and withdraw its illegal military presence from the Transnistrian region of Moldova in the nearest future".

On 7 April 2016, Russia announced it would withdraw its troops from Moldova once the problem of liquidating the 14th Army's armament depots was solved. Complicating the withdrawal is the necessity to transit the armaments through Ukraine, which has had a hostile relationship after the Russian annexation of Crimea and the Russian invasion of eastern Ukraine in 2014.

On 27 June 2016, a new law entered in force in Transnistria, punishing actions or public statements, including through the usage of mass media, networks of information and telecommunications or internet criticizing the so-called peacekeeping mission of the Russian Army in Transnistria, or presenting interpretations perceived to be "false" by the Transnistrian government of the Russian Army's military mission. The punishment is up to three years of jail for ordinary people or up to seven years of jail if the crime was committed by a person of responsibility or a group of persons by prior agreement.

On 22 June 2018, UN General Assembly adopted resolution (document A/72/L.58), which urged the Russian Federation to unconditionally withdraw its troops and armaments without delay from the territory of the Republic of Moldova.

To this day, Moldova continues requesting the withdrawal of the Russian troops from Transnistria, having done so as recently as in 2021. Furthermore, in 2022, amid an increase in tensions between Ukraine and Russia which served as a prelude to the 2022 Russian invasion of Ukraine, allegations by Ukrainian intelligence appeared that said Russia was trying to prepare "provocations" against the Russian soldiers in Transnistria in order to create a pretext for an invasion of Ukraine.

See also
 Military history of the Russian Federation
 Russian people's militias in Ukraine
 Russian-occupied territories
 Russian-occupied territories in Georgia
 Russian-occupied territories of Ukraine

References

 Dnestriansky, I. The 14th Russian Army in the Transnistria Conflict. "Art of War". 26 April 2011

Transnistria War
Transnistria conflict
Politics of Moldova
Transnistria
Politics of Transnistria
Transnistria
Transnistria
History of Transnistria since 1991
Moldova–Russia relations
Russia–Transnistria relations